Bob Stookey is a fictional character from the comic book series The Walking Dead and the television series of the same name, where he was portrayed by Lawrence Gilliard Jr. Created by Robert Kirkman and artists Charlie Adlard and Cliff Rathburn, the character made his debut in The Walking Dead #29 in June 2006. Bob is a former combat medic who is considered the town drunk of Woodbury, Georgia. Although he is a minor character in the comics, Bob is notable for saving the life of The Governor, who was severely mutilated by Michonne. His origins are explored in the companion novel The Walking Dead: The Road to Woodbury, which was written by Kirkman and Jay Bonansinga.

In the television series, Bob is introduced in the fourth season as a survivor living among the community at the prison. As with his comic counterpart, Bob is a former army medic who struggles with alcoholism. He is also dealing with depression from losing people around him, but after the prison falls he becomes romantically involved with Sasha and develops a more optimistic mindset, which he tries to convince Rick to have as well.

Appearances

Comic book series
In the comics, Bob Stookey is a 50-year-old Caucasian-American. Thirteen years before the series, Bob served as an army medic for about two weeks.

Bob is the local town drunk of Woodbury and is first seen briefly outside The Governor's house, where The Governor expresses concern that Bob isn't eating enough and tells him to get some food. Bob's minor role expands significantly when he saves The Governor's life. Gabe and Bruce Cooper call upon him to save The Governor when Alice and Dr. Stevens, the only town medical professionals, flee and Michonne tortures The Governor nearly to death. At first Bob panics and doubts he can save The Governor after seeing what's left of his body, but, he manages to compose himself and sets to work saving the Governor's life. After a slow recovery, The Governor personally asks Bob to watch over his walker daughter until the Woodbury army returns from killing the prison survivors. The Governor is killed in the assault and while Bob's fate is never revealed in the comic books, it is explained in the novels.

Novels
Bob appears in The Road to Woodbury and The Fall of the Governor which both tie-in to the comics.

In The Road to Woodbury, the story of how Bob and several others arrived at Woodbury is told. For Bob it began when his wife, Brenda Stookey, was killed and turned into a zombie. Bob was unable to put her down and instead fled to Tent City in his truck and descended into alcoholism. In Tent City he met Lilly Caul. He cared for Lilly, so when Joshua Lee Hamilton was kicked out and Lilly Caul decided to go with him, Bob joined them along with Megan Lafferty and Scott Moon. Taking Bob's truck the five of them travelled to a farm house. Bob develops a crush on Megan and grows jealous of her sexual relationship with Scott and Bob becomes persistently drunk.

While on a supply run at a Department Store, the group encounters Caesar Martinez and his men from Woodbury, after some negotiation Caesar agrees to take them back to Woodbury with him. Woodbury's leader - The Governor - took a special interest in Bob and made him his confidante, revealing many secrets such as the fact he keeps his zombified daughter, Penny, locked up in his house and that he killed all the National Guard soldiers and in return Bob tells The Governor about his affections for Megan. The Governor would even bounce ideas off Bob who at this point was nearly always too drunk to understand. Bob manages to have a one-night stand with Megan, but the next morning she kills herself and Bob has to kill her zombified form, this causes Bob to drink even more as he grows depressed.

In The Fall of the Governor, Bob's role is that of his in the comics - after the Governor has been tortured near to death by Michonne. He is found by Gabe and Bruce Cooper who tell him to save The Governor's life, which Bob somehow manages to do. Bob successfully saves The Governor's life, much to even The Governor's disbelief. The Governor is grateful to Bob and when he leaves to assault the Prison where Rick's group, he leaves Bob in charge of caring for his zombified daughter, Penny until he returns.

However, The Governor never comes back, instead only a small group led by Lilly Caul return and when she assumes leadership of Woodbury, Bob continues to live there and becomes the town doctor. Bob also leads Lilly to Penny and she puts the young girl down as well as the Governor's collection of zombie heads.

In The Walking Dead: Invasion, while saving Lilly from zombies, Bob suffers a massive heart attack brought on by his unhealthy lifestyle when he was younger. Bob dies in the arms of a devastated Lilly who stabs him in the head to keep Bob from turning.

Television series

Character biography
Bob was an army medic who has been with two other groups of survivors but they were killed while he escaped and the solitude left him depressed.

Season 4 
Daryl finds Bob about a week before the start of Season 4. Bob has seen things go bad "over and over" and winding up in the safe prison has not shaken those experiences from him.

Bob first appeared in the season premiere "30 Days Without an Accident", where it is revealed that he was a survivor who was recently rescued by Daryl, who brings him to live with the large community at the prison. Having been at the prison for a week, Bob soon feels he should start "pulling his weight" and volunteers to go on a food run led by Daryl. The scavenger group manages to get into a Big Sp!t shopping centre, where Bob heads straight for the liquor. He contemplates hiding a bottle in his jacket so the others won't notice but places the bottle back on the shelf—and in the process causes the shelf to collapse and come crashing down, pinning Bob to the ground and drawing in the walkers. He cries for help, and the rest of the group saves him, but a young man, Zach, loses his life saving him. In the next episode "Infected", when a deadly flu begins infecting many inhabitants, Bob helps fight back against members of the group who had succumbed to the flu and become walkers. In the episode "Isolation", Bob volunteers to accompany the group led by Daryl and including Tyreese and Michonne to retrieve medicine at a veterinary college, but the group is forced to abandon their car along the road when they are surrounded by walkers. In the episode "Indifference", Bob recounts to Daryl his past: he was the last survivor of his previous two groups, and he would drink himself to sleep to ease the pain. He also admits that he was responsible for Zach's death, but Daryl dismisses it and reassures his place in the group. At the college, the group manages to retrieve the medicine, however Bob is revealed to have only grabbed a bottle of liquor he found. Having lost his trust in him, Daryl threatens to beat him up if he drinks before the medicine is given to the sick. In the episode "Internment", when the group returns to the prison, Bob helps administer the medicine to the surviving inhabitants. In the mid-season finale "Too Far Gone", the Governor attacks the prison, and Bob participates in the prison's defense; the Governor's attack deals enough damage to the prison that the group is forced to abandon it and scatter amidst the chaos of the attack.

As shown in the episode "Inmates", Bob is split into a group with Sasha and Maggie. In the episode "Alone", Bob is more supportive of Maggie's decision to go to Terminus and look for Glenn, as he refuses to leave anyone alone due to the deaths of members from his two previous groups before meeting the Prison group. However Sasha does not want to look for Glenn, believing him to be dead, and Bob kisses Sasha to try to convince her to keep looking. In the episode "Us", on their way to Terminus, they are spotted by Eugene, Rosita and Abraham who were waiting in a van on the other side of the train tunnel where Glenn and Tara would be emerging from, according to Eugene's calculation. The three of them join up with Eugene, Rosita and Abraham, helping to kill a herd of walkers that were quickly surrounding Glenn and Tara. Heading forward, they find Terminus where they are greeted by Mary, one of the residents who is cooking a barbecue. However, in the season finale "A" it is shown that their supplies are taken and they are only seen in the closing moments of the episode, when Gareth forces Rick, Carl, Michonne and Daryl inside of the boxcar they are locked inside of after the shootout at Terminus.

Season 5 
In the episode "No Sanctuary", Bob is taken with Rick, Daryl and Glenn to a slaughterhouse where they helplessly witness Gareth's butchers kill four other people. Before the butchers can kill Glenn, they are distracted and Bob attempts to reason with Gareth telling him about Eugene's apparent cure but Gareth doesn't believe him. Before the slaughter can resume an explosion caused by Carol distracts Gareth, who leaves. Rick escapes and kills the butchers and he, Bob, Glenn and Daryl fight their way to the others and the group make it out of Terminus where they are reunited with Carol, Tyreese and Judith. In the episode "Strangers", Bob and the other survivors find and rescue Father Gabriel and take refuge at his nearby church. While on a supply run to a local food bank with Rick, Gabriel, Michonne and Sasha, Bob is pulled underwater by a walker in the flooded basement, but is rescued. He also talks to Rick and tells him to accept Abraham's proposal to go to Washington D.C. and they discuss the nature of the world's state. Bob tells him that one day they will find a place just like before but if they give into the world's state then they won't be able to adapt but Rick says the world now is the real world but Bob disagrees and says it's a nightmare and nightmares end, and tells Rick not to let it end who he is. Later that night, while the other survivors are celebrating their survival and mutual decision to travel to Washington, D.C., Bob kisses Sasha a few times and makes a final goodbye to her. Bob wanders outside of the church by himself and is knocked unconscious by one of the few survivors from the Terminus shootout. As Bob awakens, Gareth tells him that he is not dead just yet and claims that the Terminus group never intended to hurt them, but now his hand is forced as the shootout has caused them to lose their home and now they have to hunt and survive on their own. Bob looks down to find that his left leg has been amputated from the knee down as Gareth consumes a huge chunk of meat. Gareth tells Bob "if it makes you feel any better, you taste a lot better than we thought you would".

In the episode "Four Walls and a Roof", Bob, laughing hysterically, informs Gareth and the other Terminus survivors that they just consumed tainted meat as he was bitten by a walker (in "Strangers"). While the other members begin to react in horror and vomit, Gareth angrily kicks Bob unconscious and suggests that they will be fine as the meat was cooked. They later leave Bob on the lawn at Father Gabriel's church where the other survivors find him. Bob tells them that the place the Terminus group was at resembled a school and Rick, Sasha, Abraham, Tara, Glenn and Maggie set off to find an old elementary school while Eugene, Rosita, Tyreese, Bob, Carl and Judith are left behind. After the Terminus members are killed, the survivors say their goodbyes to Bob, as he thanks Rick for taking him in the group and advises him that the nightmare will end, but it doesn't have to end who they are and to look at Judith and see for himself that the world will change. Bob talks to Sasha about a dream he had about her before he dies. Tyreese then stabs him in the head before he can reanimate. Sasha takes his jacket after he dies and wears it as a tribute to him.

In the mid-season finale "Coda", Gabriel approaches the high school to see Gareth's actions himself and finds Bob's uneaten leg still on a cooker, finding proof for himself that Gareth was a cannibal and tossing it away in disgust. Months later Morgan Jones following a trail from Terminus also finds Bob's leg. In the mid-season premiere "What Happened and What's Going On", when Tyreese is dying from a walker bite Bob along with Beth, Lizzie and Mika appear in his hallucinations and try to comfort him and assure him his past actions were the right thing to do as Martin and The Governor, both in his head also, taunted him about how his actions led the group into chaos. Before Tyreese dies he sees Bob, Beth, Lizzie and Mika one last time telling him it is OK to let go and joins them in death. In the episode "Forget", in the Alexandria Safe-Zone Sasha is struggling to adjust into their normal society hearing them complain about simple matters and Sasha experiences flashbacks of Bob, Beth and Tyreese which causes her to snap at the others and storm off. In the season finale "Conquer", after Rick's residence in Alexandria is threatened after an outburst towards Deanna Monroe he remembers Bob's words about finding a place just like how it was and how he won't be able to adapt if he lets too much go, making Rick think that Bob was right and maybe he has begun to lose his sanity.

Development and reception
It was announced on April 26, 2013 that Lawrence Gilliard Jr. had joined the cast in a regular role as Bob Stookey, a former Army medic. The announcement explained: "Bob is deeply haunted by his past — pre- and post-zombie apocalypse. As a result, he’s a bit of a loner, although he maintains a charming/self-deprecating/confident public face."

References

Characters created by Robert Kirkman
Comics characters introduced in 2006
Fictional African-American people
Fictional alcohol abusers
Fictional amputees
Fictional military medical personnel
Image Comics male characters
Male characters in television
The Walking Dead (franchise) characters